Evergestinae is a fairly small subfamily of the lepidopteran family Crambidae, the crambid snout moths. The subfamily was described by H. Marion in 1952. It contains roughly 140 species on all continents and continental islands. Evergestine moths resemble Pyraustinae; however, the male genitalia have a long uncus and long, slender gnathos. The larvae feed mostly on Brassicaceae.

Taxonomists' opinions differ as to the correct placement of the Crambidae, some authorities treating them as a subfamily (Crambinae) of the family Pyralidae.  If this is done, Evergestinae is usually treated as a separate subfamily within Pyralidae.

Genera
Cornifrons Lederer, 1858 (= Ventosalis Marion, 1957)
Crocidolomia Zeller, 1852 (= Godara Walker, 1859, Pseudopisara Shiraki, 1913, Tchahbaharia Amsel, 1951)
Cylindrifrons Munroe, 1951
Evergestella Munroe, 1974
Evergestis Hübner, 1825 (= Aedis Grote, 1878, Paraedis Grote, 1882, Paroedis Hampson, 1899, Euergestis Warren, 1892, Euergestis Rebel, 1906–07, Homochroa Hübner, 1825, Maelinoptera Staudinger, 1893, Mesographe Hübner, 1825, Orobena Guenée, 1854, Pachyzancloides Matsumura, 1925, Pionea Duponchel, 1845, Reskovitsia Szent-Ivány, 1942, Scopolia Hübner, 1825)
Orenaia Duponchel, 1845
Prorasea Grote, 1878
Symphysa Hampson, (1898) 1899
Trischistognatha Warren, 1892

See also
 List of crambid genera

References